Bernardo C. Bernardo (January 28, 1945 – March 8, 2018) was a Filipino veteran stage actor, comedian, and film director. He was known for his role as a supporting actor for the blockbuster film Invisible, which is also known as Imbisibol in the Philippines. Bernardo was awarded the Gawad Urian Award for his Best Supporting Actor role for the film, Invisible at the 39th Gawad Urian Awards in 2016 and was also nominated for Best Supporting Actor at the 2016 FAP Awards in the Philippines. Bernardo Bernardo died on March 8, 2018, following a tumor in his pancreas.

Biography
Bernardo C. Bernardo was born on January 28, 1945, in Santa Ana, Manila. He achieved the Degree of Bachelor of Literature in Journalism from the University of Santo Tomas. Bernardo also received the theatre training at the University of California and graduated with a Master of Arts Degree at the London Academy of Music and Dramatic Art under a British council grant. He also taught Theater Arts at Meridian International College, also known as MINT College.

Career
He rose to prominence as a respectable theatre actor and gained fame as a supporting actor in the Philippines when he transitioned to film industry in the mid-1970s. He went onto win the Gaward Urian Award for Best Actor at the 5th Gawad Urian Awards in 1981 for his role as "Manay Sharon in Ishmael Bernal" for the film, Manila By Night which is also commonly known as City After Dark.

He also acted in few Filipino comedy series including the role of the antagonist (as Steve Carpio) in the comedy series, Home Along Da Riles.

Filmography

Film actor

TV Actor

Writer

Director

Production Designer

Death
Bernardo Bernardo had been undergoing treatment since January 2018 after developing a potentially life-threatening tumor in his pancreas, which was later diagnosed as pancreatic cancer. He died on March 8, 2018. Actors, directors in the Philippines and other countries paid tribute. Several critics pointed out that the death of Bernardo is a loss to the film industry as he had contributed to the film industry immensely during his lifetime.

References

External links
 

1945 births
2018 deaths
Filipino male stage actors
Filipino film directors
Filipino male comedians
20th-century Filipino male actors
21st-century Filipino male actors
University of Santo Tomas alumni
University of California alumni
People from Santa Ana, Manila
Filipino LGBT actors
LGBT film directors
Filipino LGBT comedians
Deaths from cancer in the Philippines
Deaths from pancreatic cancer
20th-century Filipino LGBT people
21st-century Filipino LGBT people